Anne M. Houtman is an American academic administrator who is the 20th president of Earlham College.

References

Living people
Women heads of universities and colleges
Heads of universities and colleges in the United States
Pomona College alumni
American Quakers
Presidents of Earlham College
Year of birth missing (living people)